Old Rip Van Winkle Bourbon Whiskey is a Kentucky Straight Bourbon whiskey produced by the Sazerac Company at its Buffalo Trace Distillery in Frankfort, Kentucky. It is sold in 750ml glass bottles. The primary brand expression is aged 10 years.

It is sometimes confused with its sister brand, Pappy Van Winkle's Family Reserve, and misleadingly so, as "Pappy" is much more expensive.

The arrangement for production of Old Rip Van Winkle at the Buffalo Trace Distillery was the result of a joint venture arrangement with the Van Winkle family that was established in June 2002.

See also
 Pappy Van Winkle's Family Reserve
 Rip Van Winkle

References

Further reading

  
 Rip Van Winkle Lawrenceburg Warehouse(internet archive)

External links
 Official site for Old Rip Van Winkle
 Official site for Buffalo Trace 

Bourbon whiskey
Sazerac Company brands